Eleanor Friede (d. 2008) was an American book editor and literary agent, best known for bringing the 1970 novella Jonathan Livingston Seagull to publication. 

Friede was born Eleanor Kask in Rochester, New York, and grew up in Valley Stream. She graduated with honors from Hofstra University and shortly thereafter went to work for World Publishing in publicity and marketing. 

She married Donald Friede, a World Publishing editor, in 1951. He died in 1965.

Friede was working as a marketing director at Macmillan in 1968 when company president Jeremiah Kaplan convinced her to become an editor. A year later she persuaded Macmillan to buy Jonathan Livingston Seagull, a fable about a seagull who breaks from his flock in search of freedom. The novella by Richard Bach sold more than three million copies in hardcover.

In 1974, Friede received her own imprint at Delacorte Press. Following Delacorte's purchase by Doubleday in the early 1980s she launched Eleanor Friede Books, a literary agency. One of the books published under the Delacorte Press was Somewhere a Cat is Waiting, a 1976 collection of three of the author Derek Tangye's books, whose works were affectionately referred to as The Minack Chronicles.

Eleanor Friede died July 14, 2008, at the age of 78.

External links
 The New York Times obituary

2008 deaths
American book editors
Literary agents
Year of birth missing
People from Rochester, New York
Hofstra University alumni